Meek House, also known as Lin Oaks, is a historic home located near Kannapolis, Cabarrus County, North Carolina. It was built about 1831, and is two-story, single-pile, side gabled, Federal / Greek Revival style house.  Also on the property is a contributing single-pen "Wheat House."

It was listed on the National Register of Historic Places in 2001.

References

Houses on the National Register of Historic Places in North Carolina
Greek Revival houses in North Carolina
Federal architecture in North Carolina
Houses completed in 1831
Houses in Cabarrus County, North Carolina
National Register of Historic Places in Cabarrus County, North Carolina